Carl E. Perry is a South Dakota politician, and currently serves in the South Dakota House of Representatives.

Perry has been serving in the South Dakota House of Representatives since 2019. He attended Northern State University from 1971 to 1973.

Election history 
2020     Dennert was re-elected with 7,108 votes; Carl Perry was also re-elected with 6,087 votes and Leslie McLaughlin received 3,843 votes and Justin Roemmick received 3,720 votes.
2018. Incumbent Representative Dan Kaiser did not run for re-election leaving one seat open. Representative Drew Dennert ran for re-election alongside Republican Carl Perry, Democrat Brooks Briscoe and Democrat Justin Roemmick. Dennert and Perry won the two seats earning 32% and 29% respectively, Briscoe and Roemmick finished in 3rd and 4th with 21% and 18%.

References

Living people
Republican Party members of the South Dakota House of Representatives
21st-century American politicians
Year of birth missing (living people)
Politicians from Aberdeen, South Dakota
Northern State University alumni